J38 may refer to:
 Elongated pentagonal orthobicupola, a Johnson solid (J38)
 , a Bangor-class minesweeper of the Royal Navy
 , a Halcyon-class minesweeper of the Royal Navy
 LNER Class J38, a British steam locomotive class
 West Engineering XJ38, an early jet engine
 J-38, a model of telegraph key